The Progressive Organisations of Switzerland (POCH;) were a communist party founded in 1969. Most of its members were from a university background.

History of the POCH 
TheIn 1977 many women's group split from the party to form the Organisation for the cause of women (German:Organisation für die Sache der Frau (OFRA)).

In 1987 the POCH distanced itself from Marxism-Leninism and changed its name to POCH-Grüne ( POCH-Greens). After the disbandment of numerous canton parties between the late 1970s and 1993 many members changed their party affiliation to the Green Party of Switzerland. The last section of the party in Basel-City disbanded in 1993, spawning in 1995 the Basel's strong alternative (German: Basels starke Alternative).

Election results

National Council

See also 
 Rotpunktverlag

References

Defunct communist parties in Switzerland
Political parties established in 1969
1969 establishments in Switzerland
Political parties disestablished in 1993
1993 disestablishments in Switzerland